Luis Gabriel Beristáin,  is a Mexican cinematographer, producer, and television director known for his work on numerous well-known films including The Distinguished Gentleman, The Spanish Prisoner, Blade II, and Street Kings, and several entries in the Marvel Cinematic Universe including the Agent Carter television series.

He has collaborated with filmmakers like Guillermo del Toro, Derek Jarman, David Mamet, and David Ayer. He is an active member of both the Academy of Motion Picture Arts and Sciences and the British Academy of Film and Television Arts.

Life and career 
Beristain was born in Mexico City, the son of actor Luis Beristáin. His interest in filmmaking began with his involvement in Mexico's independent film scene in the seventies. He studied Engineering at the Instituto Politécnico Nacional, and later joined a new film studies program at the school, while also producing audiovisual training materials for the health department.

After filming a number of documentaries, he founded a small commercial production company, before moving to Italy in 1977. At the recommendation of director Sergio Leone, he relocated to the United Kingdom, where he enrolled in the prestigious National Film and Television School, which accepted only 25 students a year. He was one of only five foreigners to be accepted into the school, and studied cinematography under Oswald Morris and Billy Williams.

His first feature film as cinematographer was the 1983 Colombian horror film Bloody Flesh (Spanish: Carne de tu carne, "Flesh of Your Flesh"), for which he won the Best Cinematography Award at the Bogotá Film Festival. His work on Derek Jarman's 1986 film Caravaggio earned him a Special Silver Bear Award at the Berlin International Film Festival. Beristain was one of several cinematographers on the 1987 anthology film Aria, which was nominated for a Palme d'Or at the Cannes Film Festival. Allen Daviau suggested he move to Hollywood, where he could apply his talents and unique insight into both Mexican and Anglo cultures. Beristain has been a member of the British Society of Cinematographers since 1990, and the American Society of Cinematographers since 2002.

While working in 2005's S.W.A.T., Beristain became friends with executive producer Louis D'Esposito, who after helping form Marvel Studios invited Beristain to do additional photography for Iron Man. He wound up in the same function in six other Marvel Cinematic Universe films, and also served as cinematographer for the D'Esposito-directed Marvel One-Shot short films Item 47 (2012) and Agent Carter (2013), as well as the television series Agent Carter. Beristein would eventually have his first feature for the studio as cinematographer in 2021's Black Widow.

Influences 
Gregg Toland, Freddie Young, Emmanuel Lubezki, Roger Deakins

Filmography

Film

Additional photography credit

Television

Awards and nominations 
 1984 Bogotá Film Festival Award for Best Cinematography: Bloody Flesh (Won)
 1987 Special Silver Bear Award: Caravaggio (Won by Derek Jarman but dedicated by him to Beristain)
 1994 VMA Award for Best Cinematography: "Amazing" (Nominated)
 1999 Silver Ariel Award for Best Cinematography: The Comet (Nominated)
2021 Cinematography Award: Coronado Island Film Festival (Won)

References

External links 
 

Mexican cinematographers
Living people
Artists from Mexico City
1955 births